Call It Conspiracy is Dozer's third album, released September 16, 2003 on their managers label Molten Universe.  For this album they worked with Swedish producer Chips Kiesbye, famous for his work with bands such as the Hellacopters.

Track listing
"Hills Have Eyes" – 4:03
"Rising"  – 3:37
"Feelgood Formula"  – 5:18
"The Exit"  – 2:10
"Spirit Fury Fire"  – 5:06
"A Matter of Time"  – 3:24
"Man Made Mountain"  – 4:50
"Way to Redemption"  – 4:23
"Crimson Highway"  – 3:01
"Black Light Revolution"  – 5:28
"Glorified"  – 3:46
"Lightning Stalker"  – 5:47

Personnel

 Fredrik Nordin (vocals, Rhythm Guitar)
 Tommi Holappa (Lead Guitar)
 Johan Rockner (Bass guitar)
 Erik Bäckwall (drums)

Additional personnel

 Chips Kiesbye (piano, percussion, noise)
 Stefan Boman (organ)

References

Dozer albums
2003 albums